Qarah Qach (also Romanized as Qarah Qāch; also known as Qareh Āqāj) is a village in Vardasht Rural District, in the Central District of Semirom County, Isfahan Province, Iran. At the 2006 census, its population was 398, in 105 families.

References 

Populated places in Semirom County